Laughing Matters is the longest-running improvisational comedy troupe in Atlanta, Georgia, USA. Formed in 1985,<ref
Name="cltray">Comedy Free-for-All by Tray Butler for Creative Loafing, February 10, 2001.  Retrieved March 25, 2007.</ref> the troupe has since branched out and now provides a wide variety of audience interactive entertainment, including murder mysteries, team building, and children’s performances.<ref
Name="ya">Young Audiences 2006 – 2007 Programming Woodruff Arts Center.  Retrieved March 26, 2007.</ref>

Laughing Matters performs both public and private shows at venues that include the Alliance Theatre, Dave & Busters, and the Fox Theatre.  They perform improv comedy monthly at a public show at Manuel's Tavern (founded by prominent Atlanta politician Manuel Maloof).

Colleges where Laughing Matters have performed include Emory University, Georgia Tech, and the University of Georgia.  Corporate clients include the 1996 Paralympic Organization Committee, BusinessWeek, Coca-Cola, IBM, and the March of Dimes.

For several years, members of Laughing Matters have portrayed clients and witnesses for the National Criminal Defense College in a program designed to sharpen the skills of defense lawyers.  The National Criminal Defense College is held in Macon, Georgia adjacent to Mercer Law School.<ref
Name="ncdc">Trial Practice Institute  National Criminal Defense College.  Retrieved March 26, 2007.</ref>

Notable current and former performers
Gary Anthony Williams plays a recurring character on the television series Boston Legal and has numerous TV and film credits.
Nick Jameson has appeared in numerous video games and animated series.
Brian Sack is a correspondent on CNN Headline's Glenn Beck program.
Mike Schatz<ref
Name="bizj">Creative Director's Hobby is no Laughing Matter by Erin Moriarty for the Atlanta Business Chronicle, September 29, 2006.  Retrieved March 25, 2007.</ref> voices the character of Emory on the animated series Aqua Teen Hunger Force.

References

External links
Laughing Matters official website 
National Criminal Defense College
Young Audience/Woodruff Arts Center

American comedy troupes
Improvisational troupes
Performing groups established in 1985
1985 establishments in Georgia (U.S. state)